At the Gates of Paradise is an album by John Zorn released on Zorn's own label, Tzadik Records, in 2011 and featuring music inspired by William Blake and the Gnostic texts from the Nag Hammadi library.

Reception

The Allmusic review by Thom Jurek awarded the album 4 stars stating "At the Gates of Paradise is, like its predecessors, among the most enjoyable and illuminating recordings in Zorn's later canon because its lyricism, rhythmic pulses, and grooves are accessible to virtually anyone".

Track listing
All compositions by John Zorn
 "The Eternals" - 5:55 
 "Song of Innocence" - 6:44 
 "A Dream of Nine Nights" - 8:33 
 "Light Forms" - 3:23 
 "The Aeons" - 5:52 
 "Liber XV" - 6:28 
 "Dance of Albion" - 6:36 
 "Song of Experience" - 4:58

Personnel
John Medeski - piano, organ 
Kenny Wollesen - vibes 
Trevor Dunn - bass 
Joey Baron - drums

References

Tzadik Records albums
Albums produced by John Zorn
John Zorn albums
2011 albums
Adaptations of works by William Blake